Paulo Jorge Sousa Vieira (born 16 February 1982), known as Alemão ("German"), is a Portuguese retired footballer who played as a goalkeeper.

Club career
Born in Paris, France to Portuguese parents, Alemão started his professional career with Sporting CP after emerging through the Lisbon club's youth ranks. He would only, however, appear for the reserves during his spell, meeting the same fate in 2003–04 with C.S. Marítimo – both teams operated in the third division.

In the following two and a half seasons, Alemão stayed in that tier, playing for Sport Benfica e Castelo Branco and G.D. Tourizense. In January 2007 he was signed by U.D. Leiria of the Primeira Liga, but only managed to be third choice during his tenure.

Alemão moved to C.D. Santa Clara from the Segunda Liga for the 2008–09 campaign, starting ahead of longtime incumbent João Botelho. In the following year he had his first experience abroad, joining Cypriot Second Division side Atromitos Yeroskipou.

References

External links

1982 births
Living people
French people of Portuguese descent
Footballers from Paris
Portuguese footballers
Association football goalkeepers
Liga Portugal 2 players
Segunda Divisão players
Sporting CP B players
Sporting CP footballers
Sport Benfica e Castelo Branco players
G.D. Tourizense players
U.D. Leiria players
C.D. Santa Clara players
Cypriot Second Division players
Atromitos Yeroskipou players
Othellos Athienou F.C. players
Portuguese expatriate footballers
Expatriate footballers in Cyprus
Portuguese expatriate sportspeople in Cyprus